Lucas Roberto Rimoldi (born 10 August 1980) is an Argentine footballer who plays as a midfielder.

Career
He is a product of the Instituto academies where he made his professional debut. In 2002, he left Instituto joining Talleres. It was reported that a businessman Diego Mazer acquired 50% economic rights of Rimoldi in 2003, for 330,000 Argentine peso.

The next season, he played for Racing in the Argentinian Primera Division, on loan from Deportivo Maldonado (a proxy club for the investors). In the end of the season he moved to Italy for Serie B outfit Genoa, from Deportivo Maldonado for €750,000 fee. He could not adapt in Genoa and thus he was loaned to Colón and Frosinone. He terminated the contract in 2007, joining Talleres. In the summer of 2008 he moved in the Greek Greek 2nd Division club PAS Giannina being one of the most influential players in the team's quest to promotion to the Greek Superlague. Ηe continued his career again in the Greek Greek 2nd Division and in the summer of 2009 signed a contract with Panserraikos F.C. On February 1, 2010, he joined Iraklis F.C. However, Rimolid left the club to return to his home country on June of the same year, joining recently promoted All Boys.

References

External links
 Argentine Primera statistics  
 BDFA profile 
 2006–07 La Gazzetta dello Sport profile 
 

1980 births
Living people
Argentine footballers
Argentine expatriate footballers
Italian footballers
Genoa C.F.C. players
PAS Giannina F.C. players
Panserraikos F.C. players
Iraklis Thessaloniki F.C. players
Racing Club de Avellaneda footballers
Talleres de Córdoba footballers
Club Atlético Colón footballers
All Boys footballers
Toros Neza footballers
Association football midfielders
Serie B players
Serie C players
Argentine Primera División players
Football League (Greece) players
Expatriate footballers in Greece
Expatriate footballers in Mexico
Footballers from Córdoba, Argentina
Argentine expatriate sportspeople in Greece
Argentine expatriate sportspeople in Mexico